The Stade Jules Ribet is a rugby stadium in Saint-Gaudens in France. It is the current home ground of Elite One Championship side Saint-Gaudens Bears. The current capacity is 5,000 with 2,000 seated.

History 

Rugby has been played on the site since 1898. When in 1958 a new rugby league club was formed this was the obvious venue for the club. The ground currently has one main stand which seats 2,000 spectators. The ground has also hosted the touring Australia national rugby league team during the 1960s, and more recently in 2011. In 2002 the rugby league Challenge Cup came to town when Saint-Gaudens Bears hosted English side Halifax losing the game 26–48 in front of a crowd of 3,200

Representative Rugby League Matches 

On February 27, 2015, it hosted a Six Nations Under 20s Championship match between France and Wales with France winning 27 - 5.

References

Rugby league stadiums in France
Sports venues in Haute-Garonne